The Order of the Fish was the highest honour bestowed by the emperor during the Mughal Empire.  

A standard made out of metal in the form of a fish head was normally carried. The fish was the goonch (Bagarius yarrelli). The standard was called Mahi Maratib, also spelled Mahi-maratib.

See also
Bharat Ratna

References

Orders, decorations, and medals of India
Government of the Mughal Empire